Redneck is a 1973 Italian-British crime-thriller film directed by Silvio Narizzano.

Plot
Memphis, the “American”, assaulted a jewelry store with “Moskito”, whose real name is Dino Bianco, while Dino's hippie-esque friend Maria is waiting in the getaway car. The action is poorly prepared and the implementation fails, which causes Memphis to react brutally. On their escape, they find the 13-year-old son of the British consul in a stolen car, whom they take hostage. The American's actions are becoming more and more confused and brutal; so he shoots Maria and forces Moskito to drown a German family so that they - Memphis is now wounded - can get to safety. Moskito becomes friends with Lennox, the kidnapped boy, and tries to stop the American from doing what he is doing. A few meters before the border they are caught by the police and are killed.

Cast 
Franco Nero as Mosquito
Telly Savalas as Memphis
Mark Lester as Lennox Duncan
Ely Galleani as Maria
Duilio Del Prete as Captain Lenzi 
Maria Michi as Princess 
Beatrice Clary as Margaret Duncan
 Bruno Boschetti as Police Officer 
 Aldo De Carellis as Riccardo
 Tommy Duggan as Anthony Duncan
 Giuseppe Mattei as Jeweller   
Lara Wendel as German Girl (credited as Daniela Barnes)

References

External links

1970s Italian-language films
Poliziotteschi films
1970s crime thriller films
Films directed by Silvio Narizzano
Films about kidnapping
Films about hostage takings
1970s road movies
British road movies
1970s British films
1970s Italian films